Xincheng District is one of four districts of the prefecture-level city of Hohhot, the capital of Inner Mongolia Autonomous Region, China. This district is located in the northeast of Hohhot. Xincheng District spans 700 square kilometers and has 699,672 inhabitants as of the 2020 census.

References

County-level divisions of Inner Mongolia